The 2019 Dhaka North City Corporation by-election was held on 28 February 2019 due to the death of Mayor Annisul Huq. The election was boycotted by the main opposition, the  BNP. A total of 5 mayoral candidates took part in election. Atiqul Islam won the election by 786,473 votes. This election had a low turnout, with a decrease of 6.24% from the last election.

Results

References 

2019 elections in Bangladesh
Local elections in Bangladesh
2019 in Bangladesh
February 2019 events in Bangladesh
Dhaka